Luis Alejandro Ramírez López (born 2 July 1997) is a Venezuelan footballer who currently plays as a midfielder for Caracas.

Career statistics

Club

Notes

References

1997 births
Living people
Footballers from Caracas
Venezuelan footballers
Venezuelan expatriate footballers
Association football midfielders
Estudiantes de Caracas players
FK Senica players
Caracas FC players
Venezuelan Primera División players
Slovak Super Liga players
Expatriate footballers in Slovakia
Venezuelan expatriate sportspeople in Slovakia
21st-century Venezuelan people